The Ditomyiidae are a small (90 species) family of flies (Diptera).They are found worldwide (except in the Afrotropical Region), most species are found in the Australasian and Neotropical realms. There are only two genera in Europe Ditomyia Winnertz, 1846 and Symmerus Walker, 1848   
Ditomyia is found in Central Europe Symmerus in Northern Europe
Symmerus is endemic to the Palaearctic.

Genera
Asioditomyia Saigusa, 1973
Australosymmerus (Freeman, 1951)
Ditomyia Winnertz, 1846
Neocrionisca Papavero, 1977
Nervijuncta Marshall, 1896
Rhipidita Edwards, 1940
Symmerus Walker, 1848
Burmasymmerus Burmese amber, Myanmar, Late Cretaceous (Cenomanian)

References

 
Nematocera families
Articles containing video clips